Eden Hartford (born Edna Marie Higgins; April 10, 1930 – December 15, 1983) was an American film actress from 1957 to 1962. She was the third and last wife of comedian Groucho Marx from 1954 until their divorce in 1969. 

She was born to Edgar Higgins and Beatrice Higgins (née Thomas) in Utah as Edna Marie Higgins. She was a member of the Church of Jesus Christ of Latter-day Saints. Her elder sister was actress Dee Hartford, who was married to film director Howard Hawks.

Death
She died at Cedars-Sinai Medical Center in Los Angeles, California in 1983, aged 53, from endometrial cancer. Before her death she had been living in Palm Springs, California. Hartford's ashes are interred in a small niche at Westwood Memorial Cemetery, with her former married name of 'Marx' on her epitaph.

References

External links
 
 

1930 births
1983 deaths
American film actresses
People from Greater Los Angeles
Actresses from Salt Lake City
Deaths from uterine cancer
Deaths from cancer in California
20th-century American actresses
Latter Day Saints from Utah
Latter Day Saints from California